Hank Zipzer is a British  children's television series, based on the Hank Zipzer book series by Henry Winkler and Lin Oliver. It stars Nick James as the 12-year-old dyslexic schoolboy, Hank Zipzer.  Winkler also portrays Mr. Rock, Hank's music teacher. Unlike the books that took place in Winkler's native United States, the series takes place in London, in the United Kingdom. It also included a 2016 Christmas special, Hank Zipzer's Christmas Catastrophe. HBO Max began streaming all three seasons on May 13, 2022, and will begin streaming Hank Zipzer's Christmas Catastrophe on December 2, 2022.

Plot 
The series focuses on the misadventures of Hank Zipzer, a 12-year-old schoolboy in London who is dyslexic. Hank's friends are named Frankie and Ashley, and Nick McKelty is his worst enemy.

Cast

Episodes 

The first season premiered in January 2014 on CBBC. Unlike the books that took place in America, the series takes place in Britain. The second season began airing on 13 August 2015. Javone Prince made his first appearance as Mr. Joy in series 2, episode 5, "Hank's Hero". The third season began airing on 26 May 2016, which was followed by an 84-minute Christmas television film, Hank Zipzer's Christmas Catastrophe, in December 2016.

Production

Development
Henry Winkler has stated that they "could not sell the show in America. We couldn't sell the books. They said, 'Oh Hank Zipzer is so funny...but we won't do the television show. So we sold it to the BBC." At a later date, after the series was successful on the BBC, it was broadcast on the Universal Kids Channel in the United States.

CBBC commissioned the series in 2013 to be produced by Kindle Entertainment, and filming commenced in October 2013.
Matt Bloom was the lead director on all three series.

Casting
Nick James was cast as Hank, while Henry Winkler was cast as the music teacher Mr. Rock (who was based on a music teacher Winkler once had in high school at McBurney). Winkler said that the real Mr. Rock was the only teacher in his high school who believed in him. In particular, when he was in the eleventh grade, this teacher told him: “Winkler if you ever do get out of here you are going to be great,” a statement that helped him get through school.

Filming
The show was filmed at St Catherine's Catholic High School in Halifax, Yorkshire for series 1–2. Series 3 was filmed at Birkdale High School in Dewsbury, Yorkshire.

Series changes

Second series
On 9 June 2014, Cheryl Taylor, the CBBC Controller, announced that the show had been renewed for a second series of thirteen episodes. Nick James, Henry Winkler, Felicity Montagu, and Nick Mohammed were all confirmed to return, as Hank, Mr. Rock, Miss Adolf, and Mr. Love respectively. Additionally, Javone Prince joined the main cast as Mr. Joy.

Jon Macqueen replaced script editors Lucy Guy and Danny Springs, while Jim Poyser joined as a producer. Returning writers include Mark Oswin and Madeleine Brettingham, who each wrote one episode and former script editor Lucy Guy, who wrote two. Several new writers worked on the second series, including Jon Macqueen (two episodes), Mark Evans (one episode), and Adam G. Goodwin & Jonathan Parkyn (one episode).

Cancellation
In April 2017, Neil Fitzmaurice, who plays Stan, Hank's father, confirmed that there will not be a new series of the show.

Reception

Release
Announcements began to circulate in November 2013 that  CBBC (the BBC's children's channel) had commissioned a television series of thirteen 30-minute episodes based on the Hank Zipzer books, while Kindle Entertainment, Walker Productions, and DHX Media partnered to create the series that would be debuting in early 2014. Winkler also announced the debut of the series at the 2013 British Academy of Film and Television Arts awards.

Broadcasts
The show ran for three series (and one Christmas special), from January 2014 to December 2016 on the CBBC channel. All three seasons of the series stream globally on HBO Max, and in the U.K. on BBC iPlayer. HBO Max began streaming Hank Zipzer's Christmas Catastrophe on December 2, 2022.

Awards
Nick James won the British Academy Children's Awards for Performer for his portrayal of Hank Zipzer in 2016. When discussing the award, James noted that he has received tweets from parents and children that the show has helped them understand and come to terms with dyslexia.

See also
 List of artistic depictions of dyslexia

References

External links 
Hank Zipzer (Seasons 1-3) - HBO Max
Hank Zipzer's Christmas Catastrophe - HBO Max
Hank Zipzer (Seasons 1-3) - BBC iPlayer (only available in the U.K.)

Hank Zipzer Channel - CBBC
Henry Winkler Interview - Hank Zipzer - CBBC, August 5, 2016

Hank Zipzer
Hank Zipzer
Hank Zipzer
Hank Zipzer
Dyslexia in fiction
Hank Zipzer
Hank Zipzer
Hank Zipzer